Mohd Noor Ali is a Singaporean former footballer and current head coach.

Club career
Throughout his career, he played as a midfielder or winger for Tampines Rovers, Geylang United, SAFFC, Woodlands Wellington and Hougang United in the S.League, as well as Admiralty FC in the NFL Division 2 before hanging up his boots. He returned to club action for Geylang International in the 2013 season during an injury crisis at the 2nd half of the season.

He helped mastermind one of the greatest shock in Singapore football when he aided Geylang United to the 2001 S.League title. However, the season ended in disaster when they were thrashed 8-0 by Home United in the Singapore Cup final, a match in which Noor Ali was sent off. During this time he started a partnership with Aleksandar Duric when they played together for Geylang United and SAFFC.

Noor Ali was charged by FAS in 2003 with placing bets on S-League games, thus breaching the S-League Players' Code of Conduct, and banned for the season.

He captained SAFFC to their 5th league title in 2006, despite losing the last match of the season to former club Geylang United.

He won the Singapore Cup in 2009 while playing for Geylang United.

International career
Mohd Noor Ali made his international debut for Singapore in 1998 and has not been selected since 2004. In total, he made 36 appearances for the Lions.

National team career statistics

Goals (partial) for Senior National Team

Coaching career

He became the assistant coach for Geylang International FC for the 2017 S.League season.

He became the permanent head coach for The Eagles on 20 June 2017.

He guided Geylang International FC for a fourth-place finish in the 2017 S.League season. It was the first time since 14 years that they finished in the top 4 place.

In January 2018, he left Geylang International FC after he was sent to Matsumoto Yamaga FC for 10-month training stint to have a better experience in coaching. He was replaced by Hirotaka Usui. Noor Ali's stint in Japan proved to be a fruitful one as he guided the Matsumoto Yamaga U-18 ‘B’ team to the Takamado Cup JFA U-18 Football League 2018 Nagano Prefecture title. His side won 11 matches and lost only 3 while scoring 37 goals and only conceding 11 en route to the title. He returned to his position at Geylang after his Yamaga's stint.

Personal life
His brother, Jamil Ali, is also a former professional footballer.

Honours

Club

As Player

SAFFC 

 S.League: 2006, 2007
 Singapore Cup: 2007

Geylang United 

 S.League: 2001 
 Singapore Cup: 2009

As Coach 

 Takamado Cup JFA U-18 Football League Nagano Prefecture: 2018

International
Singapore
ASEAN Football Championship: 1998

References

External links 

http://www.sleague.com/Web/Main.aspx?ID=,68e68380-9e0b-44b2-8a32-d06df7470ca6&AID=f713ba5f-59ad-4f9e-bb13-7c2fbbec49ea&NLT=300
http://www.sleague.com/Web/Main.aspx?ID=,68e68380-9e0b-44b2-8a32-d06df7470ca6&AID=3eb528d5-ff8b-4ded-aee8-bdb35bf8be3a&NLT=300
http://www.goal.com/en-sg/news/3880/singapore/2013/08/03/4161000/noor-ali-to-come-out-of-retirement-for-geylang

Singaporean footballers
Singapore Premier League players
Singapore international footballers
Geylang International FC players
Warriors FC players
Hougang United FC players
Tampines Rovers FC players
Woodlands Wellington FC players
Living people
1975 births
Association football midfielders
Association football forwards